Lachaussée-du-Bois-d'Écu is a commune in the Oise department in northern France.

See also
 Communes of the Oise department

References

Communes of Oise
Oise communes articles needing translation from French Wikipedia